Paseo del Mar is a street in the Palos Verdes Peninsula of Los Angeles, California, specifically stretching from Palos Verdes Estates, through Rancho Palos Verdes, to San Pedro that goes along the Pacific Ocean. The street is part of another street, Palos Verdes Drive.

In the early 1980s, due to the disrepair of water mains and storm drains by the city and the California Water Service Company, a landslide destabilized the cliffs and destroyed The Chasan Villa, a property designed and owned by prominent Los Angeles civil rights and disabled rights attorney Roslyn Chasan and prominent physician Fred Chasan.

By 1984 the area surrounding Paseo del Mar and Palos Verdes Drive was used as the location for the headquarters of The Avengers and later home of Tony Stark (Iron Man) in the Marvel Cinematic Universe. The design inspiration for the compound was based on The Chasan Villa.

In November 2011, part of the street fell into the ocean in a landslide.

References

Streets in Los Angeles